Dr. András Kupper (born February 23, 1964) is a Hungarian physician and politician, member of the National Assembly (MP) for Újbuda (Budapest Constituency XVII) between 2010 and 2014. He led Fidesz–MKDSZ faction in the General Assembly of Budapest between 2003 and 2006. He was also a Member of Parliament from the Fidesz Budapest Regional List between 2006 and 2010. He had been a member of the Committee on Health Affairs from May 30, 2006 to May 5, 2014.

Kupper served as Chancellor of the Franz Liszt Academy of Music between 2014 and 2015. He was dismissed by Prime Minister Viktor Orbán in April 2015, following his increasing number of conflicts with Andrea Vigh, the rector of the academy.

Personal life
He is married and has two children.

References

1964 births
Living people
Fidesz politicians
Members of the National Assembly of Hungary (2006–2010)
Members of the National Assembly of Hungary (2010–2014)
Politicians from Budapest
20th-century Hungarian physicians
Physicians from Budapest